Japhet Ndabeni Ncube is a Zimbabwean politician. He is also a commissioner at the Zimbabwean Human Rights Commission and chairs the Thematic Working group on Socio-Economic and Cultural Rights.

Early career 
Ncube trained as a primary school teacher in the 1950s and taught at Njube Primary School from 1960 to 1963.  He spent the next four years (1964 – 1968) in Zambia and Tanzania before going for further studies in Europe, beginning with a short stay in Germany where he completed his A Level equivalent before moving to the U.K.

Political life 
He joined the Liberation Movement in the youth wing of the Zimbabwe African Peoples’ Union (ZAPU) and left the country for Zambia late in 1963. He was the mayor of Bulawayo, the second largest city in the country, from 2001 to 2008. He was a member of the MDC, and joined MDC-M during the split in that party. He unsuccessfully contested the Bulawayo Central national assembly seat, losing to the MDC-T candidate, Dorcas Sibanda.

Personal life 
Ncube is married and has children, grandchildren and one great grandchild.

See also
 List of mayors of Bulawayo
 Timeline of Bulawayo

References



Year of birth missing (living people)
Living people
Mayors of Bulawayo
People from Bulawayo